Snezhinsky (masculine), Snezhinskaya (feminine), or Snezhinskoye (neuter) is the name of several rural localities in Russia:
Snezhinsky, Kemerovo Oblast, a settlement in Staropesterevskaya Rural Territory of Belovsky District of Kemerovo Oblast
Snezhinsky, Novosibirsk Oblast, a settlement in Chulymsky District of Novosibirsk Oblast